Bab El Oued is a district in Algiers Province, Algeria. It was named after its capital, Bab El Oued.

Municipalities
The district is further divided into 4 municipalities:
Bab El Oued
Bologhine
Casbah 
Oued Koriche 
Raïs Hamidou

Notable people

 Rezki Zerarti, painter, artist

References

Districts of Algiers Province